= Culmicole =

A culmicole is an organism that lives on the tips of the leaves and stems of grasses. An example of a culmicole are species of planthoppers, which spend their lives perched on grass blades. The name was coined by Lincoln et al. in 1985.
